Valery Panyushkin (born June 26, 1969) is a Russian journalist and writer.

Works
 Узник тишины: История про то, как человеку в России стать свободным и что ему за это будет, 2006
 Незаметная вещь, 2006
 Газпром. Новое русское оружие, 2008
 12 несогласных - 12 Who Don't Agree, 2009 
 Михаил Ходорковский. Узник тишины 2, 2009
 Код Горыныча: Что можно узнать о русском народе из сказок, 2009
 Восстание потребителей, 2012
 Код Кощея: Русские сказки глазами юриста, 2012
 Рублевка: Player’s handbook, 2013
 Все мои уже там. - Эксмо, 2013
 Русские налоговые сказки, 2014

External links
 Valery Panyushkin

1969 births
Living people
Writers from Saint Petersburg
Russian journalists